The Chung Hwa University of Medical Technology (CUMT) is a private university in Rende District, Tainan, Taiwan.

The university offers undergraduate programs in medical technology, nursing, physical therapy, occupational therapy, medical imaging and radiological sciences, and health care administration. 

CHUMT also offers a number of graduate programs, including a Master of Science in Medical Laboratory Science, a Master of Science in Nursing, a Master of Science in Rehabilitation Sciences, and a Master of Science in Health Care Management. 

The university is also known for its research programs, particularly in the areas of medical technology and allied health sciences.

History
CUMT was originally established in 1968 as China Junior College of Medical Technology. In 1999, the school was upgraded to Chung Hwa College of Medical Technology. On 1 February 2007, the college was upgraded to Chung Hwa University of Medical Technology.

Faculties
 College of Health Care and Management
 College of Human Science and Technology
 College of Medicine and Life Science

See also
 List of universities in Taiwan

References

External links
 

1968 establishments in Taiwan
Educational institutions established in 1968
Private universities and colleges in Taiwan
Universities and colleges in Tainan
Universities and colleges in Taiwan
Technical universities and colleges in Taiwan